(+)-Larreatricin hydroxylase is an enzyme with systematic name (+)-larreatricin:oxygen 3'-hydroxylase. This enzyme catalyses the following chemical reaction

 (+)-larreatricin + O2 + AH2  (+)-3'-hydroxylarreatricin + A + H2O

This enzyme is isolated from the plant Larrea tridentata (creosote bush) and can be produced recombinantly.

References

External links 
 

EC 1.14.99